Harvey Allen may refer to:

 Harvey A. Allen (1818–1882), Alaskan politician in the 1870s
 Harvey Allen (coach) (1888–1957), American football player and coach and college president
 Harry Julian Allen (1910–1977), also known as Harvey Allen, NASA engineer and administrator

See also
 Hervey Allen (1889–1949) American author
 Allen (surname)